is the first major label album by Japanese band Halcali, their third original album, and fourth album release overall. The first press limited edition came with a bonus DVD. It is Halcali's first album to be released in both CD only, and CD+DVD formats.

Cyborg Oretachi also includes productions by O.T.F, Utamaru (Rhymester), Natalie Wise, Honestly, and Fantastic Plastic Machine, as well as collaborations and guest performances from Dr.kyOn (ex Bo Gumbos), Ram Rider, Your Song Is Good, Polysics, Skaparahorns, and Kendo Kobayashi.

Even though the single "Tōgenkyō / Lights, Camera. Action!" was listed as a double A-side, "Lights, Camera. Action!" is not on the album.

Track listing

CD
 "Doo The Hammer!!"
 "It's Party Time!"
 
 "Twinkle Star"
 "endless lover's rain"
  
 
  
 
 
 "Tip Taps Tip "

DVD
 "Tip Taps Tip"
 "Twinkle Star"
 "Look"
 
 "It's Party Time!"
 "It's Party Time! Making"

References 

2007 albums
Halcali albums